Brigadier Bertrand Combes,  (13 April 1894 – 12 April 1971) was an Australian soldier who served during the First World War and Second World War.

Bertrand was the only son of Algernon James Ernest Combes and his wife Catherine,  Weingarth. 

He landed at Gallipoli with the 14th Battalion. During operations in the Monash Valley, he was shot in the chest on 2 May 1915. He was evacuated and recovered in hospital in Egypt. Bertrand met Rosa Marion Ellis Begg, a nurse, in Egypt, they were married on 15 April 1916.

Combes was the commandant of the Royal Military College, Duntroon from 1942, until 1945. He was made a Commander of the Military Division of the Order of the British Empire in June 1944.

References

1894 births
1971 deaths
Australian brigadiers
Australian Commanders of the Order of the British Empire
Australian military personnel of World War I
Australian Army personnel of World War II
Military personnel from New South Wales
Burials in Victoria (Australia)